Tiaropsidae is a family of cnidarians belonging to the order Leptothecata.

Genera:
 Octogonade Zoja, 1896
 Tiaropsidium Torrey, 1909
 Tiaropsis Agassiz, 1849

References

Tiaropsidae
Leptothecata
Cnidarian families